Jamaica lies 140 km (87 mi) south of Cuba and  west of Haiti. However, Jamaica is the largest island of the Commonwealth Caribbean and the third largest of the Greater Antilles, after Cuba and Hispaniola. Many small islands are located along the south coast of Jamaica, such as the Port Royal Cays. To the southeast lies Morant Bank, with the Morant Cays,  from Morant Point, the easternmost point of mainland Jamaica.

Geology and landforms

Jamaica and the other islands of the Antilles evolved from an arc of ancient volcanoes that rose from the sea millions of years ago. During periods of submersion, thick layers of limestone were laid down over the old igneous and metamorphic rock. In many places, the limestone is thousands of feet thick. The country can be divided into three landform regions: the eastern mountains, the central valleys and plateaus, and the coastal plains.

The highest area is the Blue Mountains range. These eastern mountains are formed by a central ridge of metamorphic rock running northwest to southeast from which many long spurs jut to the north and south. In this part of the country, the old metamorphic rock reveals itself through the surrounding limestone. To the north of the Blue Mountains lies the strongly tilted limestone plateau forming the John Crow Mountains. To the west, in the central part of the country, are two high rolling plateaus: the Dry Harbour Mountains to the north and the Manchester Plateau to the south. Between the two, the land is rugged and here, also, the limestone layers are broken by the older rocks. Streams that rise in the region flow outward and sink soon after reaching the limestone layers.

The limestone plateau covers two-thirds of the country, so that karst formations dominate the island. Karst is formed by the erosion of the limestone in solution. Sinkholes, caves and caverns, disappearing streams, hummocky hills, and terra rosa (residual red) soils in the valleys are distinguishing features of a karst landscape; all these are present in Jamaica. To the west of the mountains is the rugged terrain of the Cockpit Country, one of the world's most dramatic examples of karst topography.

On the north, the main defining feature is the fault-based "Escarpment", a long ridge that extends from Flagstaff in the west, through Windsor in the centre, to Campbells and the start of the Barbecue Bottom Road (B10). The Barbecue Bottom Road, which runs north-south, high along the side of a deep, fault-based valley in the east, is the only drivable route across the Cockpit Country. However, there are two old, historical trails that cross further west, the Troy Trail, and the Quick Step Trail, both of which are seldom used  and difficult to find. In the southwest, near Quick Step, is the district known as the "Land of Look Behind," so named because Spanish horsemen venturing into this region of hostile runaway slaves were said to have ridden two to a mount, one rider facing to the rear to keep a precautionary watch. Where the ridges between sinkholes in the plateau area have dissolved, flat-bottomed basins or valleys have been formed that are filled with terra rosa soils, some of the most productive on the island. Queen of Spains Valley, Nassau Valley, and Cave Valley were formed by the same process.

Coasts
The coastline of Jamaica is one of many contrasts. The northeast shore is severely eroded by the ocean. There are many small inlets in the rugged coastline, but no coastal plain of any extent. A narrow strip of plains along the northern coast offers calm seas and white sand beaches. Behind the beaches is a flat raised plain of uplifted coral reef.

The southern coast has small stretches of plains lined by black sand beaches. These are backed by cliffs of limestone where the plateaus end. In many stretches with no coastal plain, the cliffs drop  straight to the sea. In the southwest, broad plains stretch inland for a number of kilometres. The Black River courses  through the largest of these plains. The Rio Minho is 92.8 km long and is the longest river in Jamaica (previously, the Black River was thought to be the longest). The swamplands of the Great Morass and the Upper Morass fill much of the plains. The western coastline contains the island's finest beaches.

Climate

Two types of climate are found in Jamaica. An upland tropical climate prevails on the windward side of the mountains, whereas a semiarid climate predominates on the leeward side. Warm trade winds from the east and northeast bring rainfall throughout the year. The rainfall is heaviest from May to October, with peaks in those two months. Rainfall is much greater in the mountain areas facing the north and east, however.

Temperatures may dip to below  at the peaks of the Blue Mountains. The island receives, in addition to the northeast trade winds, refreshing onshore breezes during the day and cooling offshore breezes at night. These are known on Jamaica as the "Doctor Breeze" and the "Undertaker's Breeze," respectively.

Jamaica lies in the Atlantic hurricane belt; as a result, the island sometimes experiences significant storm damage. Powerful hurricanes which have hit the island directly causing death and destruction include Hurricane Charlie in 1951 and Hurricane Gilbert in 1988. Several other powerful hurricanes have passed near to the island with damaging effects. In 1980, for example, Hurricane Allen destroyed nearly all Jamaica's banana crop. Hurricane Ivan (2004) swept past the island causing heavy damage and a number of deaths; in 2005, Hurricanes Dennis and Emily brought heavy rains to the island. A Category 4 hurricane, Hurricane Dean, caused some deaths and heavy damage to Jamaica in August 2007.

The first recorded hurricane to hit Jamaica was in 1519. The island has been struck by tropical cyclones regularly. During two of the coldest periods in the last 250 years (1780s and 1810s), the frequency of hurricanes in the Jamaica region was unusually high. Another peak of activity occurred in the 1910s, the coldest decade of the 20th century. On the other hand, hurricane formation was greatly diminished from 1968 to 1994, which for some reason coincides with the great Sahel drought.

Vegetation and wildlife

Although most of Jamaica's native vegetation has been stripped in order to make room for cultivation, some areas have been left virtually undisturbed since the time of European colonization. Indigenous vegetation can be found along the northern coast, from Rio Bueno to Discovery Bay, in the highest parts of the Blue Mountains, and in the heart of the Cockpit Country.

As in the case of vegetation, considerable loss of wildlife has occurred, beginning with the settlement of the Taíno in the region millennia ago. For example, the Caribbean monk seal (Neomonachus tropicalis) once occurred in Jamaican waters, and has now been driven to extinction. Mongooses (Urva auropunctata), introduced to Jamaica in 1872 to reduce rat populations that damaged commercial sugarcane (Saccharum officinarum) crops, prey on several Jamaican species, including the critically endangered Jamaican iguana (Cyclura collei), and have been implicated in the historical population declines and extinctions of many others.

Other wildlife species inhabiting the island include the West Indian manatee (Trichechus manatus), the American crocodile (Crocodylus acutus), and the endemic and endangered Homerus swallowtail butterfly (Papilio homerus), which is the largest butterfly species in the Western Hemisphere.

Extreme points 

 Northernmost point: Half Moon Point, Saint James Parish
 Southernmost point: Portland Point, Clarendon Parish
 Westernmost point: South Negril Point, Westmoreland Parish
 Easternmost point: Morant Point, Saint Thomas Parish

See also

 Jamaica
 List of cities and towns in Jamaica

References